Patrick Lam (born 24 June 1983) is a Hong Kong equestrian. He competed in two events at the 2008 Summer Olympics.

References

External links
 

1983 births
Living people
Hong Kong male equestrians
Olympic equestrians of Hong Kong
Equestrians at the 2008 Summer Olympics
Place of birth missing (living people)
Asian Games medalists in equestrian
Equestrians at the 2010 Asian Games
Equestrians at the 2018 Asian Games
Asian Games bronze medalists for Hong Kong
Medalists at the 2010 Asian Games